Poland will participate at the 2017 Summer Universiade in Taipei, Taiwan.

Medal summary

Archery

Compound

Recurve

Athletics 

Men
Track & road events

Field events

Women
Track & road events

Field events

Badminton

Basketball

Women's tournament

Group stage

|}

Diving

Men

Fencing

Men

Women

Golf

Gymnastics

Artistic 
Men

Women

Judo

Men

Women

Swimming

Men

Women

Table tennis

Taekwondo

Tennis

Men

Women

Mixed

Weightlifting

References

External links
Poland at the medals table

Nations at the 2017 Summer Universiade
2017 in Polish sport
2017